Celine is a small settlement north of Raka in the Municipality of Krško in eastern Slovenia. The area is part of the traditional region of Lower Carniola. It is now included with the rest of the municipality in the Lower Sava Statistical Region.

Celine lies in a predominantly mountain area and is popular for its vineyards.

References

External links
Celine on Geopedia

Populated places in the Municipality of Krško